Richard Clark Turner (September 30, 1927 – September 28, 1986) was an American lawyer and politician.

Born in Avoca, Iowa, Turner graduated from Avoca High School. He then served in the United States Army Air Forces from 1945 to 1947. In 1950, he graduated from University of Iowa and then received his law degree from University of Iowa College of Law in 1953. He then practiced law in Avoca and served as town clerk for Avoca. He then practiced law in Council Bluffs, Iowa. From 1961 to 1965, Turner served in the Iowa State Senate and was a Republican. Turner then served as Iowa Attorney General from 1968 to 1978. In 1974, he defeated Tom Miller in the Attorney General election by 4.5 percent, before losing the 1978 rematch by 11.5 percent. Turner then returned to practice law. He served as United States Attorney for the Southern District of Iowa from 1981 until his death in 1986, two days before his 59th birthday. Turner died from a heart attack in a hospital in Des Moines, Iowa.

Notes

1927 births
1986 deaths
Politicians from Council Bluffs, Iowa
Military personnel from Iowa
United States Army Air Forces soldiers
University of Iowa alumni
University of Iowa College of Law alumni
Iowa lawyers
Republican Party Iowa state senators
United States Attorneys for the Southern District of Iowa
Iowa Attorneys General
20th-century American politicians
20th-century American lawyers
People from Avoca, Iowa